Asthawan is one of 243 constituencies of the Bihar Legislative Assembly, in India.  It is a part of Nalanda lok sabha constituency along with other assembly constituencies viz Islampur, Harnaut, Hilsa, Nalanda, Biharsharif and Rajgir.

Members of Legislative Assembly

Election results

2020

2015

2010

References

External links
 

Politics of Nalanda district
Assembly constituencies of Bihar